Patrick Gellineau (born 3 September 1951) is a former Trinidad cyclist. He competed in three events at the 1972 Summer Olympics.

References

1951 births
Living people
Trinidad and Tobago male cyclists
Olympic cyclists of Trinidad and Tobago
Cyclists at the 1972 Summer Olympics
Sportspeople from Port of Spain
20th-century Trinidad and Tobago people